Henry Eric Bergman (1893–1958), born Heinrich Erich Bergmann, was a Canadian artist born in Dresden, Germany. Bergman’s training was as a commercial wood engraver illustrating catalogs and business prospectuses. He later took up fine art working in pencil, watercolour, oil paint, colour wood block printing but he is best known for his fine black and white wood engravings. Bergman was close friends with Harold R. Foster who created the comic strip Prince Valiant, and appeared on the Hal Foster episode of This Is Your Life in 1954.

Chronology 
November 10, 1893 born in Dresden, Germany
1911 obtained a Diploma of Merit from the Art and Trade School of Dresden, after three years of study.
1913 he came to Canada 
1914 joined Brigdens Limited in Winnipeg, Manitoba where he spent many years as a commercial wood engraver for the Eaton's catalogue.
1922 – he was inspired by Fred Brigden and Walter J. Phillips to take up fine arts
1926 - first wood engraving
1927 and 1930 His work was reproduced in special editions of The Studio
 1933 + 1936 exhibited in the Warsaw Exhibition 
February 9, 1958 died Winnipeg, Manitoba, Canada
Also a charter member of the Winnipeg Art Gallery, charter member and past president of the Society of Canadian Painter-Etchers and Engravers (founded in 1916), and a member of the Canadian Handicrafts Guild.

Bibliography 
Dillow, Nancy E. Transformation of Vision: The Works of H. Eric Bergman 1983 Winnipeg Art Gallery
City artist, H. E. Bergman dies at 64, Winnipeg Free Press, 11 February 1958, page 32.
Bergman, Eric. The Studio, November 1936 p. 322 - 325
 . IPPY Award-winning biography.
 Roy, James A. The Heart is Highland. 1947 McClelland & Stewart Ltd., Toronto with woodcut illustrations by H. Eric Bergman.

See also

 List of German Canadians

References

External links 
Bergman prints in the National Gallery of Canada collection
 www.artistarchive.com  A catalogue of over 120 prints, many with images.

1893 births
1958 deaths
People from Dresden
People from the Kingdom of Saxony
German engravers
German wood engravers
German emigrants to Canada
Artists from Winnipeg
German male artists
Canadian engravers
Canadian wood engravers
Canadian male artists
20th-century engravers